Nestor Rita (1605 – 17 March 1687) was a Roman Catholic prelate who served as Titular Archbishop of Sebaste in Cilicia (1670–87) and Titular Bishop of Zenopolis in Lycia (1669–70).

Biography
Nestor Rita was born in 1605. On 2 December 1669, he was appointed during the papacy of Pope Clement IX as Titular Archbishop of Zenopolis in Lycia. On 18 May 1670, he was consecrated bishop by Pietro Vidoni, Cardinal-Priest of San Callisto, with Federico Baldeschi Colonna, Titular Archbishop of Caesarea in Cappadocia, and Francesco Maria Febei, Titular Archbishop of Tarsus, serving as co-consecrators. On 20 August 1670, he was appointed during the papacy of Pope Clement X as Titular Archbishop of Sebaste in Cilicia. He served as Titular Archbishop of Sebaste in Cilicia until his death on 29 November 1680.

References 

17th-century Roman Catholic titular archbishops
Bishops appointed by Pope Clement IX
Bishops appointed by Pope Clement X
1605 births
1687 deaths